Mišićevo (Serbian Cyrillic: Мишићево) is a village located in the Subotica municipality, in the North Bačka District of Serbia. It is situated in the autonomous province of Vojvodina. The village is ethnically mixed and its population numbering 446 people (2002 census).

Name
In Serbian Cyrillic the village is known as Мишићево, in Serbian Latin as Mišićevo, in Bunjevac as Mišićevo, in Croatian as Mišićevo, and in Hungarian as Hadikörs.

Ethnic groups (2002)

Serbs = 208 (46.64%)
Bunjevci = 150 (33.63%)
Croats = 35 (7.85%)
Hungarians = 18 (4.04%)
Yugoslavs = 15 (3.36%)

Historical population

1981: 517
1991: 509

See also
List of places in Serbia
List of cities, towns and villages in Vojvodina

References

Slobodan Ćurčić, Broj stanovnika Vojvodine, Novi Sad, 1996.

Places in Bačka
Subotica